The Tian Shan foothill arid steppe ecoregion (WWF ID: PA0818) covers the northern and western approaches to the Tian Shan mountains, centered on Lake Issyk-Kul in Kyrgyzstan.  This region receives more moisture from Central Asia, thereby supporting more vegetation and diversity of plant and animal species than the deserts to the south.

Location and description 

The ecoregion stretches around the lower altitudes of the Tian Shan mountain ridge, running for approximately 1,000 km from western Kyrgyzstan to a small section inside the western reaches of Xinjiang Province in China.  The foothills of the northwestern Tian Shan are a series of ridges and lake basins in this region.  Elevations for this ecoregion are 150 - 660 meters.

Climate 
Several different climate classifications are represented in the ecoregion, both semi-arid and humid.  The most widespread in the northeast is cold semi-arid (Köppen climate classification (BSk)).  This climate is generally characterized as having precipitation greater than a true desert, and also a colder temperature.  The western areas of the ecoregion, and the closer areas to the main ridge, are warmer, particularly in the summer, with high temperatures above 32 degrees C in July.

Flora and fauna 
The semi-desert of the lower foothills feature Fescue (Festuca) and feather grass (Stipa), with sagebrush and similar shrubs (genus Artemisia), and salt-tolerant tamarisk (Tamarix).  Common mammals include red fox, corsac fox, wolf, steppe cat, weasels, ferrets, and various voles and shrews.

See also 
 Ecoregions in China

References 

Ecoregions of China
Ecoregions of Kazakhstan
Ecoregions of Kyrgyzstan
Palearctic ecoregions
Temperate grasslands, savannas, and shrublands